Rani Bhabani (1716–1803), also known as Ardhabangeshwari(অর্ধবঙ্গেশ্বরী) and Natorer Rani or the Queen of Natore, was a Hindu zamindar during the British colonial era in what is now Rajshahi, Bangladesh. She became the zamindar after the death of her husband Raja Ramkanta Moitra (Ray), 'Zamindar' of Natore estate. The Rajshahi Raj or Natore estate was a large zamindari which occupied a vast position of Bengal. After the death of her husband, Rani Bhabani of Natore Rajbari, expanded both the estate and the palace.

Biography
Born in 1716 in a Brahmin family of Chhatimgram village, Bogra District, her father's name was Atmaram Choudhury, a landlord of Chatin village in Bogra district, now in Bangladesh. Bhabani was married off to Raja Ramkanta Moitra (Ray), the then zamindar of Rajshahi. After his death in 1748, Bhabani became the de jure zamindar, and started being referred to as Rani, or queen. A woman as a zamindar was extremely rare in those days, but Rani Bhabani managed the vast Rajshahi zamindari so efficiently and effectively for over four decades, that the annual income from land exceeded 15 million rupees of which 7 million rupees was paid to the state and the rest was utilised for building public utilities and supporting the needy.

After becoming the zamindar, she recognised the need for a strong army to protect her state from the Nawab of Bengal Siraj ud-Daulah, who had a reputation of debauchery, and began to reform and reorganise her army. Her fears came true, and soon the Nawab sent a messenger demanding her daughter Tara to satisfy his lust. When Rani Bhabani refused, the angry Nawab sent an army to abduct Tara, depose the Rani and loot the treasury. The Rani, herself leading her army, routed the nawab's army and drove it out of her territories. The people of Natore also joined the Rani's army in the fight against the Nawab.

Rani Bhabani's house in Natore remains a major tourist attraction in Bangladesh to date.

Rani Bhabani died in 1803, at the age of 79, 46 years after the Battle of Plassey.

Contributions and works
Rani Bhabani became a household name among the common people due to her philanthropy and general generosity, combined with an austere personal life. The number of temples, guesthouses and roads she constructed across Bengal is believed to be in the hundreds. She also built numerous water tanks, alleviating the acute water problem of her subjects. She built a road from Howrah to Varanasi, which is still in use today. She was also interested in the spread of education and donated generously to many educational institutes.

She tried to bring social reform by introducing widow remarriage in society but was unsuccessful. During the Great Bengal famine of 1770, she helped the poor by hiring eight vaidyas to help the people at her own expense.

In Baranagar, from 1753 to 1760, she commissioned the building of 108 terracotta Shiva temples, with the aim of turning the place into a second Varanasi. Many of the temples are lost due to the changing course of the river. Among the surviving temples are the Char Bangla Temples.

She also made great contributions in Tarapith and Benaras. Tarapith, a Hindu Temple town situated in the Indian province of West Bengal is famous for (goddess Tara) & Hindu saint Bamakhepa. The Durga Kund Mandir in Varanasi was constructed by Rani Bhabani.

During the era of Rani Bhabani, she made some great contributions for the development and renovation of Bhabanipur temple. Bhabanipur is a shakti-peeth which is located at Sherpur Upazila of Bogra District.

In popular culture
'Rani Bhabani', a 1952 film directed by B.Ratan Chatterjee.

References

1716 births
1795 deaths
People from Bogra District
Bengali Hindus
19th-century Indian philanthropists
18th-century philanthropists
Women in British Overseas Territories
Indian women philanthropists
Women of the Mughal Empire
Mughal nobility
Indian women in war